The Florida State Seminoles college football team represents the Florida State University in the Atlantic Coast Conference (ACC). The Seminoles compete as part of the NCAA Division I Football Bowl Subdivision. The program has had 13 head coaches, and one interim head coach, since it began play during the 1902 season. Since December 2019, Mike Norvell has served as head coach at Florida State.

Seven coaches have led Syracuse in postseason bowl games: Tom Nugent, Bill Peterson, Larry Jones, Bobby Bowden, Jimbo Fisher, Odell Haggins, and Norvell. Three of those coaches also won conference championships: Don Veller captured three as a member of the Dixie Conference; Bowden captured twelve and Fisher three as a member of the Atlantic Coast Conference.

Bowden is the leader in overall wins and seasons coached with 304 wins during his 34 years as head coach. Fisher has the highest winning percentage at 0.783. Ed Williamson has the lowest winning percentage at 0.000. Of the 13 different head coaches who have led the Seminoles, Bowden and Darrell Mudra have been inducted into the College Football Hall of Fame.

Key

Coaches

Notes

References

Florida State

Florida State Seminoles football coaches